The County Court in Quay Street, Manchester, England, is a Georgian townhouse that functioned as the Manchester County Court from 1878 to 1990. It was the home of the politician and reformer Richard Cobden and subsequently the site of Owen's College, the forerunner of the University of Manchester.  In origin it is a townhouse of the 1770s, "the best preserved Georgian house in the [city] centre".  The house is of "brick with a late nineteenth century doorcase". It was designated a Grade II* listed building on 3 October 1974.  The interior is not original.

Richard Cobden lived at the house from 1836 to 1850, and it was his base during the years he acted as the main spokesman for the Anti-Corn Law League. A statue of him, together with one of his fellow reformers John Bright, stands in Albert Square. The house subsequently became the site of Owens College, which, together with the Manchester Royal School of Medicine, became the Victoria University of Manchester in 1880. When the college moved to its present site on Oxford Road in 1873, the building was bought for use as Manchester's County Court, which opened in 1878. By the 1970s the building had become badly decayed, and first the courts and then the administrative offices were relocated. The court was closed in 1990. It was subsequently purchased for use as a set of barristers' chambers and has been comprehensively refurbished, with much of its original Georgian decor restored.

Architecture

The house of three storeys and a basement is a Georgian townhouse built in the mid-18th century and subsequently extended to the rear and altered. It is constructed on a rectangular plan in red brick in Flemish bond on a stucco plinth. Its facade has five bays with the centre bay set slightly forward. The central doorway has a late 19th-century pilastered doorcase with a frieze and cornice which replaced the original raised pedimented doorway and double flight of steps. Its windows have raised sills and flat heads, with 12-pane sashes at ground and first floor levels and 9-pane sashes on the second floor while the basement has segmental-headed windows.

See also
Listed buildings in Manchester-M3

References

Bibliography

Grade II* listed buildings in Manchester
Grade II* listed houses
Georgian architecture in England